The Orto Botanico dell'Università di Camerino, also known as the Orto Botanico di Camerino, is a nearly  botanical garden operated by the University of Camerino, and located at Viale Oberdan 2, Camerino, Province of Macerata, Marche, Italy.

The garden was established in 1828 by Vincenzo Ottaviani, from 1826-1841 papal physician and professor of botany and chemistry. It is divided into two main parts: a flat area with shrubs and herbaceous species, and a slope with many trees and ferns.

Exhibits
The garden contains two greenhouses with tropical and subtropical species, with many succulents and epiphytes including Begonia, Orchidaceae, and Tillandsia, as well as Cinnamomum camphora, Kalanchoe beharensis, Nepenthes mirabilis, Piper nigrum, Stanhopea tigrina, etc.

Its tree species include: 
 
 Celtis australis
  Fagus sylvatica
  Ilex aquifolium
  Pinus nigra subsp. laricio
  Quercus cerris
  Quercus ilex
  Quercus petraea
  Staphylea pinnata
  Taxus baccata
  Ginkgo biloba
  Gleditschia triacanthos
  Liriodendron tulipifera
  Parrotia persica
  Sequoiadendron giganteum
  Asplenium onopteris
  Athyrium filix-femina
  Phyllitis scolopendrium
  Polypodium cambricum
  Polypodium vulgare
  Polystichum lonchitis
  Polystichum aculeatum
  Polystichum setiferum

Other specimens include: 
 
  Aceras anthropophorum
  Achillea barrelieri
  Achillea oxyloba
  Aquilegia magellensis
  Arctostaphylos uva-ursi
  Aubrieta columnae
  Biarum tenuifolium
  Centaurea scannensis
  Centaurea tenoreana
  Cistus creticus
  Cistus monspeliensis
  Cistus salviifolius
  Cymbalaria pallida
  Drypis spinosa
  Edraianthus graminifolius
  Ferula glauca
  Festuca dimorpha
  Gagea granatelli
  Galium magellense
  Leontopodium alpinum
  Ophrys carbonifera
  Ophrys sphegodes
  Orchis morio
  Orchis pauciflora
  Ranunculus magellensis
  Romulea bulbocodium
  Romulea columnae
  Saponaria bellidifolia
  Saxifraga porophylla
  Sideritis italica
  Soldanella alpina
  Soldanella minima
  Viola eugeniae

See also 
 List of botanical gardens in Italy

References 
 Orto Botanico dell'Università di Camerino (Italian)
 Horti entry (Italian)
 Giovanni Battista de Toni, L'Orto botanico dell' Università di Camerino nel 1900, 1900.
 F. Pedrotti, "L’Orto Botanico di Camerino", Dimore storiche italiane, 34: 24-25, 1997.
 G. Sarfatti, "L’Orto Botanico di Camerino", Agricoltura, 12: 55-58, 1963.

University of Camerino
Botanical gardens in Italy
Gardens in Marche
Buildings and structures in Camerino
Camerino